The men's 10 metre air rifle competition at the 2000 Summer Olympics was held on 18 September.

Records
Prior to this competition, the existing world and Olympic records were as follows.

Qualification round

DNS Did not start – Q Qualified for final

Final

OR Olympic record

References

Sources

Shooting at the 2000 Summer Olympics
Men's events at the 2000 Summer Olympics